Mitch Lees (born 12 October 1988) is an Australian rugby union player. Lees joined English side London Welsh from Eastwood. Lees made his senior grade debut for Eastwood in 2010, having joined the club as a colt. He made his 100th appearance for Eastwood in May 2013. His performances for Eastwood saw him selected for the ACT Brumbies A team in 2013.

Lees signed for Aviva Premiership side Exeter Chiefs on 10 April 2014. He was a replacement as Exeter Chiefs defeated Wasps to be crowned champions of the 2016-17 English Premiership.

On 10 July 2019, Lee left Exeter to sign for Top 14 side Brive in France from the 2019-20 season.

References

External links
London Welsh profile

1988 births
Living people
Rugby union locks
Australian rugby union players
Australian people of English descent